Amblyglyphidodon indicus also known as the Maldives damselfish is a species of fish in the family Pomacentridae. It is native to the Indian Ocean, including the Red Sea and the Maldives. The fish reaches 8.3 centimeters in length. Its diet includes zooplankton and floating organic material. It is likely that this fish is reef-associated. It has been noted at depths up to 15 meters.

References

External links
 

indicus
Fish of the Indian Ocean
Fish described in 2002